The 2010–11 season was the 136th season of competitive football in Wales.

Overview

Men's national team

The home team is on the left column; the away team is on the right column.

Friendly match

Euro 2012 Qualifying

The Welsh men's national team were drawn into UEFA Euro 2012 qualifying Group G.

All fixtures for this group were negotiated between the participants at a meeting in Frankfurt, Germany on 21 and 22 February 2010.

Nations Cup

In February 2011 Wales would play the inaugural game of the new Nations Cup, which was staged in Dublin, Republic of Ireland during February and May 2011.

Women's national team
As hosts of the 2011 FIFA World Cup, Germany did not have to play qualifying.

Friendly matches

2011 FIFA Women's World Cup qualification

2011 Algarve Cup

Honours

League football

North Wales

South Wales

Welsh clubs' performance in Europe

* Welsh club score shown first.

European qualification

League Tables

Welsh Premier League

Leading goalscorer: Rhys Griffiths (Llanelli) - 25

Cymru Alliance

Leading goalscorer: Gary O'Toole (Gap Connah's Quay) - 31

Welsh Football League First Division

Welsh Cup

Welsh League Cup

See also

Wales national football team
Wales women's national football team
2010–11 Welsh Premier League
2010–11 Cymru Alliance
2010–11 Welsh Football League Division One
2010–11 Welsh Cup
2010–11 Welsh League Cup

Notes

  After 90 minutes of play Llanelli drew 2 – 2 with Tauras Tauragė in the second leg. This meant the score was 4 – 4 on aggregate and after 30 minutes of extra time Tauras Tauragė would progress to the next round after the game finished 5 – 4.
 Technogroup Welshpool Town deducted 15 points for fielding ineligible players and a further three points for failing to fulfil a fixture

References

Bibliography

Notes 

 
Seasons in Welsh football